Love in 3 Colors is a 1999 South Korean television drama series produced and broadcast by KBS starring Choi Ji-woo, Ryu Jin, Lee Hwi-hyang and Park Jin-hee. It premiered on KBS2 on May 9, 1999, and ended on November 14, 1999, airing every Saturday and Sunday at 20:00 for 56 episodes.

Story
The title suggests the love of the main male character to three women he loves: his mother, his older sister and future partner-in-life.

Characters
Ryu Jin as Han Jae-hyuk
Choi Ji-woo as Eun Ji-soo
Lee Hwi-hyang as Kim Sun-young
Park Jin-hee as Jang Su-jin
Kim Chan-woo as Dr. Kang Hyun-woo
Yunjin Kim as Jang Hee-ju
Kang Boo-ja as Park Ok-nam
Roh Joo-hyun as President Jang Dong-wook
Ryu Yong-jin as Yoo Jae-soo
Jang Yong as Chief Kang Se-ho
Kim Chang-sook as Choi Mi-ja
Jung Joon as Kang Hyun-do
Kim Yong-sun as Seung-hye
Choi Chul-ho as Kim Jung-min
Lee Byung-chul as Mr. Jang
Bae Do-hwan as Bae Mong-gyun
Choi Jae-won as Lee Joo-tak
Lee Han-na as General Manager Park Myung-hae
Sung Dong-il as Ahn Yoon-gi
Kim Bok-hee as Lee Boo-nam
Kim Ji-young as Yang Mi-ri

External links
 

Korean Broadcasting System television dramas
1999 South Korean television series debuts
1999 South Korean television series endings
Korean-language television shows
South Korean romance television series